Fabián Ferrari (born 29 October 1964) is an Argentine swimmer. He competed in two events at the 1984 Summer Olympics.

References

1964 births
Living people
Argentine male swimmers
Olympic swimmers of Argentina
Swimmers at the 1984 Summer Olympics
Place of birth missing (living people)